Leif Allan Andrée (born Leif Allan Johansson 29 January 1958 in Stockholm) is a Swedish actor.

Andrée has been engaged at Teater Galeasen, Riksteatern, Chinateatern, Stockholm City Theatre and Unga Riks.

Films
Kvinnorna på taket (1989)
 1989 – 1939
The Rabbit Man (1990)
 1990 – Blackjack
"Harry Lund" lägger näsan i blöt! (1991)
Mord och passion (1991)
Luigis Paradis (1991)
 1992 – Blueprint
Min store tjocke far (1992)
 1993 – Chefen fru Ingeborg
 1994 – Den vite riddaren
Sommaren (1995)
Kalle Blomkvist - Mästerdetektiven lever farligt (1996)
 1997 – Pelle Svanslös
The Last Contract (1998)
 1998 – Pip-Larssons
1998 - S:t Mikael
1998 - Rederiet
 1999 – Eva & Adam
Tomten är far till alla barnen (1999)
 (2000)
Hur som helst är han jävligt död (2000)
Pelle Svanslös och den stora skattjakten (2000)
Once in a Lifetime (2000)
Om inte (2001)
 2001 – Kaspar i Nudådalen
Beck – Mannen utan ansikte (2001)
 2002 – Stora teatern
Psalmer från köket (2003)
Number One (2003)
 2003 – Details
Finding Nemo (2003 - Swedish voice of Marlin)
Om jag vänder mig om (2003)
 2003 – c/o Segemyhr
 2004 – The Return of the Dancing Master
Lilla Jönssonligan på kollo (2004)
Kyrkogårdsön (2004)
Kim Novak badade aldrig i Genesarets sjö (2005)
Vinnare och förlorare (2005)
Den utvalde (2005)
Mun mot mun (2005)
 2005 – Coachen
2005 - Lasermannen
Inga tårar (2006)
Wallander – Jokern (2006)
 2006 – Världarnas bok
 2007 – Gynekologen i Askim
Gud, lukt och henne (2008)
 2008 – Värsta vännerna
2008 - Livet i Fagervik
2008 - Oskyldigt dömd
Kommisarie Späck (2010)
2012 - Äkta Människor
2012 - Nobel's Last Will
2012 - Brave (Swedish voice of King Fergus)
2014 - Rio 2 (Swedish voice of Eduardo)

References

External links

1958 births
Living people
Male actors from Stockholm
Swedish male film actors
Swedish male television actors
20th-century Swedish male actors
21st-century Swedish male actors